Dr. Mohan Yadav is an Indian politician and member of the Bharatiya Janata Party. Yadav is a member of the Madhya Pradesh Legislative Assembly from the Ujjain Dakshin constituency in Ujjain district.

Political career
He became MLA for the first time in 2013 from Ujjain Dakshin seat. In 2018 Madhya Pradesh Legislative Assembly elections, he was once again elected and became MLA from Ujjain Dakshin seat.

On 2 July 2020 he took the oath as cabinet minister in the Madhya Pradesh Government headed by Shri Shivraj Singh Chouhan.

References 

People from Ujjain
Bharatiya Janata Party politicians from Madhya Pradesh
Madhya Pradesh MLAs 2013–2018
Madhya Pradesh MLAs 2018–2023
Living people
1965 births